Vejjajiva is a Thai surname. Notable people with the surname include:

Abhisit Vejjajiva (born 1964), Thai politician and Prime Minister of Thailand
Ngarmpun Vejjajiva (born 1963), Thai writer and translator

Thai-language surnames